Euchromius malekalis is a moth in the family Crambidae. It was described by Hans Georg Amsel in 1961. It is found in Iran and Jordan.

References

Crambinae
Moths described in 1961
Moths of Asia